Château de la famille d'Eplingen is a château in the commune of Hagenthal-le-Bas, in the department of Haut-Rhin, Alsace, France. Built in either the 16th or 17th century, the château became a national property in 1799 and remained so until it moved into private hands in the 1840s. The remodeling performed by its new owners were mostly to the external structure of the building. It has been owned by the town since 2003 and listed as a historical monument since 2010.

References

Châteaux in Haut-Rhin
Monuments historiques of Haut-Rhin